Andrey Rublev was the defending champion but lost in the semifinals to Peter Gojowczyk.

Adrian Mannarino won the title after defeating Gojowczyk 6–4, 6–4 in the final.

Seeds

Draw

Finals

Top half

Bottom half

References
 Main Draw
 Qualifying Draw

Open BNP Paribas Banque de Bretagne - Singles
2017 Singles